A Decade Under the Influence may refer to:

 A Decade Under the Influence (song), a song by Taking Back Sunday
 A Decade Under the Influence (film), a 2003 American documentary film